The Chicago and Milwaukee Subdivision (commonly referred to as the C&M Subdivision or C&M Sub) is a  railway line running between Chicago, Illinois and Milwaukee, Wisconsin. It is mostly dispatched by the Canadian Pacific Railway (through its primary United States subsidiary, the Soo Line Railroad) from a CP Rail facility in Minneapolis. From Pacific Junction to Chicago Union Station, it is dispatched by Metra's Consolidated Control Facility. The C&M Subdivision is the primary of CP's two northern routes from Chicago. The Union Pacific Railroad operates its Milwaukee Subdivision, a former Chicago & Northwestern Railway line, parallel to the C&M (albeit to the east).

From Chicago Union Station to Pacific Junction (Tower A-5), the territory is triple tracked and primarily hosts Amtrak and Metra trains. From Pacific Junction (Tower A-5) to Milwaukee, it is double tracked. Freight trains do not go further south of Pacific Junction (Tower A-5) unless they are reversing to access the Belt Railway of Chicago at Cragin Junction (where the Milwaukee District West Line's Grand/Cicero station is located). This junction is the northernmost point of the Belt Railway.

The line carries Amtrak's Empire Builder and Hiawatha Service, while Metra operates trains on the Milwaukee District North Line between Union Station and Rondout. The Wisconsin & Southern Railroad runs freight services from Janesville, Wisconsin to Chicago WSOR  using trackage rights south of Rondout. Canadian Pacific also runs frequent freight trains on this line.

History 
The line had previously been owned by the Chicago, Milwaukee, St. Paul and Pacific Railroad, commonly known as the Milwaukee Road. It once carried the Milwaukee Road's fast Hiawatha passenger trains, including trains that regularly exceeded . For several years in the 1940s and early 1950s, trains were scheduled to run along this stretch in 75 minutes or less. While stricter regulations eventually reduced the speed limit to  along this stretch, plans are in place as of 2010 to improve the line to support speeds up to —modestly faster than historic trains that used the route.

References

Canadian Pacific Railway lines in the United States
Rail infrastructure in Wisconsin
Rail infrastructure in Illinois